Karen Austin is an American actress. She played Lana Wagner on the sitcom Night Court in 1984. Her film appearances include Summer Rental (1985), Jagged Edge (1985), and The Ladies Club (1986).

Career
Austin first gained notability in the late 1970s with a string of television guest appearances on highly rated programs such as Happy Days, The Rockford Files, CHiPs, and Dallas. 

In the 1980s, she was a regular on the first season of the successful NBC comedy series Night Court, where she played court clerk Lana Wagner for 10 episodes before leaving the series. Her character was replaced by Mac Robinson (Charles Robinson) for the remaining eight seasons. She had a lead role as the wife of John Candy's character in Summer Rental (1985).

Personal life
Austin was married to Kris Slava at age 19; the couple divorced seven years later.

Filmography and TV credits

References

External links
 
 
 

Living people
American film actresses
American television actresses
Mary Baldwin University alumni
Actresses from West Virginia
20th-century American actresses
21st-century American actresses
Year of birth missing (living people)